Sivananda Saraswati (or Swami Sivananda; 8 September 1887 – 14 July 1963) was a yoga guru, a Hindu spiritual teacher, and a proponent of Vedanta. Sivananda was born in Pattamadai, in the Tirunelveli district of Tamil Nadu, and was named Kuppuswami.  He studied medicine and served in British Malaya as a physician for several years before taking up monasticism. 

He was the founder of the Divine Life Society (DLS) in 1936, Yoga-Vedanta Forest Academy (1948) and author of over 200 books on yoga, Vedanta, and a variety of subjects. He established Sivananda Ashram, the headquarters of the DLS, on the bank of the Ganges at Muni Ki Reti,  from Rishikesh, and lived most of his life there.

Sivananda Yoga, the yoga form propagated by his disciple Vishnudevananda, is now spread in many parts of the world through Sivananda Yoga Vedanta Centres. These centres are not affiliated with Sivananda's ashrams, which are run by the Divine Life Society.

Biography

Early life 

Swami Sivananda was born as Kuppuswami to a brahmin family on 8 September 1887. His birth tooke place during the early hours of the morning as the Bharani star was rising in Pattamadai village on the banks of the Tamraparni river in Tirunelveli district, Tamil Nadu. His father, Sri P.S. Vengu Iyer, worked as a revenue officer, and was a great Shiva Bhakta (Bhakti) himself. His mother, Srimati Parvati Ammal, was religious. Kuppuswami was the third and last child of his parents.

As a child, he was very active and promising in academics and gymnastics. He attended medical school in Tanjore, where he excelled.  He ran a medical journal called Ambrosia during this period. Upon graduation, he practiced medicine and worked as a doctor in British Malaya for ten years, with a reputation for providing free treatment to poor patients. Over time, a sense that medicine was healing on a superficial level grew in Dr. Kuppuswami, urging him to look elsewhere to fill the void, and in 1923 he left Malaya and returned to India to pursue his spiritual quest.

Initiation 

Upon his return to India in 1924, he went to Rishikesh where he met his guru, Vishvananda Saraswati, who initiated him into the Sannyasa order, and gave him his monastic name. The full ceremony was conducted by Vishnudevananda, the mahant (abbot) of Sri Kailas Ashram. Sivananda settled in Rishikesh, and immersed himself in intense spiritual practices.  Sivānanda performed austerities for many years while continuing to nurse the sick. In 1927, with some money from an insurance policy, he ran a charitable dispensary at Lakshman Jhula.

Founding the Divine Life Society 
Sivananda founded the Divine Life Society in 1936 on the banks of the Ganges River, distributing spiritual literature for free. Early disciples included Satyananda Saraswati, founder of Satyananda Yoga.

In 1945, he created the Sivananda Ayurvedic Pharmacy, and organised the All-world Religions Federation. He established the All-world Sadhus Federation in 1947 and the Yoga-Vedanta Forest Academy in 1948.  He called his yoga the Yoga of Synthesis, combining the Four Yogas of Hinduism (Karma Yoga, Bhakti Yoga, Jnana Yoga, Rāja Yoga), for action, devotion, knowledge, and meditation respectively.

Sivananda travelled extensively on a major tour in 1950, and set up branches of the Divine Life Society throughout India. He vigorously promoted and disseminated his vision of yoga, to the extent that his detractors nicknamed him "Swami Propagandananda". His Belgian devotee André Van Lysebeth wrote that his critics "disapproved of both his modern methods of diffusion, and his propagation of yoga on such a grand scale to the general public", explaining that Sivananda was advocating a practice that everybody could do, combining "some asanas, a little pranayama, a little meditation and bhakti; well, a little of everything".

Vegetarianism
Sivananda insisted on a strict lacto-vegetarian diet for moral and spiritual reasons, arguing that "meat-eating is highly deleterious to health". His Divine Life Society thus advocates a vegetarian diet.

Mahasamadhi
Swami Sivananda died, described as entering Mahasamadhi, on 14 July 1963 beside the River Ganges at his Sivananda Ashram near Muni Ki Reti.

Disciples 
Sivananda's two chief acting organizational disciples were Chidananda Saraswati and Krishnananda Saraswati. Chidananda Saraswati was appointed president of the DLS by Sivananda in 1963 and served in this capacity until his death in 2008. Krishnananda Saraswati was appointed General Secretary by Sivananda in 1958 and served in this capacity until his death in 2001.

Disciples who went on to grow new organisations include:

 Chinmayananda Saraswati, founder of the Chinmaya Mission
 Karunananda Saraswati, founder of The Valley of Peace yoga ashram in the Moonbi Ranges north of Tamworth, New South Wales, Australia
 Sahajananda Saraswati, Spiritual Head of Divine Life Society of South Africa
 Satchidananda Saraswati, founder of the Integral Yoga Institutes, around the world
 Satyananda Saraswati, founder of Bihar School of Yoga
 Shantananda Saraswati, founder of Temple of Fine Arts (Malaysia & Singapore)
 Sivananda Radha Saraswati, founder of Yasodhara Ashram, British Columbia, Canada
 Venkatesananda Saraswati, inspirer of Ananda Kutir Ashrama in South Africa and Sivananda Ashram in Fremantle, Australia
 Vishnudevananda Saraswati, founder of the Sivananda Yoga Vedanta Centres, HQ Canada

Works 

Sivananda wrote 296 books on subjects including metaphysics, yoga, vedanta, religion, western philosophy, psychology, eschatology, fine arts, ethics, education, health, sayings, poems, epistles, autobiography, biography, stories, dramas, messages, lectures, dialogues, essays and anthology. His books emphasised the practical application of Yoga philosophy over theoretical knowledge.

References

Bibliography

 
 (1944) Yogic Home Exercises. Easy Course of Physical Culture for Men & Women, Bombay, Taraporevala Sons & Co.

 Sivananda and the Divine Life Society: A Paradigm of the "secularism," "puritanism" and "cultural Dissimulation" of a Neo-Hindu Religious Society, by Robert John Fornaro. Published by Syracuse University, 1969.
 From Man to God-man: the inspiring life-story of Swami Sivananda, by N. Ananthanarayanan. Published by Indian Publ. Trading Corp., 1970.
 Swami Sivananda and the Divine Life Society: An Illustration of Revitalization Movement, by Satish Chandra Gyan. Published by s.n, 1979.
 Life and Works of Swami Sivananda, by Sivānanda, Divine Life Society (W.A.). Fremantle Branch. Published by Divine Life Society, Fremantle Branch, 1985. 
 Sivananda: Biography of a Modern Sage, by Swami Venkatesānanda. Published by Divine Life Society, 1985.

External links 

 
  
 Biography and spiritual instructions

 

1887 births
1963 deaths
20th-century Hindu philosophers and theologians
Indian autobiographers
Indian Hindu monks
Indian Hindu spiritual teachers
Indian spiritual writers
Indian vegetarianism activists
Indian yoga gurus
Modern yoga gurus
Modern yoga pioneers
Neo-Vedanta
Scholars from Dehradun